The Los Angeles Convention Center is a convention center in the southwest section of downtown Los Angeles. It hosts multiple annual conventions and has often been used as a filming location in TV shows and movies.

History

The convention center, designed by architect Charles Luckman, opened in 1971 and expanded in 1981, 1993 and 1997. It was originally built as a rectangular building, between Pico Boulevard and 11th Street (now Chick Hearn Ct.) on Figueroa Street. The northeast portion of the center was demolished in 1997 to make way for the Staples Center. The Convention Center Annex of green glass and white steel frames, mainly on the south side of Pico, was designed by architect James Ingo Freed.

The area in front of the convention center is known as the Gilbert Lindsay Plaza, named for the late councilman who represented the Downtown area of Los Angeles for several years. A -high monument honoring "The Emperor of the Great 9th District" was unveiled in 1995.  The drive between Figueroa Street and the convention center building is also named after Councilman Lindsay.

On March 1, 1983, a tornado caused damages to the roof and upper-level panels. The building was repaired and new convention center lettering signs were installed at a total cost of $3 million.

On September 15, 2008, the convention center became the first in the U.S. and first Los Angeles City building of its age and size in the U.S. to be Leadership in Energy and Environmental Design (LEED) certified for Existing Buildings from the United States Green Building Council.

In 2013, the Los Angeles City Council voted to let Anschutz Entertainment Group manage the convention center.

Events
The convention center hosts annual events such as the Los Angeles Auto Show, the Abilities Expo, the Anime Expo, and is best known to video game fans as host to the Electronic Entertainment Expo, also known as E3.

Grammy Week
During the week leading up to the annual Grammy Awards, the convention center typically hosts several Grammy week events. Since 2005, the convention center has hosted the MusiCares Person of the Year tribute, which takes place two days prior to the Grammy Awards.

It also hosted the pre-telecast portion of the Grammy Awards (preceding the main telecast at the Crypto.com Arena) until 2013, when the pre-telecast was moved to the Nokia Theatre (now the Microsoft Theater).

The 2021 awards were held in and around the convention center, owing to the COVID-19 pandemic.

Emmy Week
Following the annual Primetime Emmy Awards ceremony, the convention center hosts the Governors Ball, one of the major Emmy after-parties.

2028 Summer Olympics
During the 2028 Summer Olympics, the convention center will host six sports. It will host Women's basketball preliminary games, Boxing, Fencing, Taekwondo, Table Tennis and BMX Freestyle. It will be a part of the Live Site Olympic Zone down Figueroa St. Boxing might not be included at the 2028 games if the IOC decides to drop the sport from the Olympic sport program.

Features

The lobby floors in the north half of the building feature two large  multicolor maps of inlaid terrazzo. The project was installed by artist Alexis Smith in 1993. A map of the world centered on the Pacific Rim covers the entire floor of the main lobby, while a map of the constellations around the north celestial pole covers the floor of the upstairs lobby.
 South Hall (Tom Bradley (Mayor) Exhibit Hall)
 Kentia Hall (beneath South Exhibit Hall, can be converted into a 415-car parking garage)
 West Hall (Sam Yorty (Mayor) Exhibit Hall)
 Neil Petree Hall
 Concourse (two-story meeting room bridging over Pico Boulevard)
 3 food courts
 On-site parking for 5,600 vehicles including electrical charge stations

Expansion proposals
In 2010, the Anschutz Entertainment Group and businessman Casey Wasserman proposed construction of Farmers Field, a US$1 billion combination football stadium and convention center, meant to attract the return of a National Football League (NFL) team to the Los Angeles area. The development proposal was abandoned in March 2015.

A new proposal was developed in 2015, approved by city hall and a design team was chosen.  A new convention hall, called "LACOEX", would be built, with a connection to the south hall.

See also

 William M. Hughes, Los Angeles City Council member, 1927–1929, urged conventions to come to Los Angeles
 List of convention centers in the United States

References

External links
Los Angeles Convention Center website

Convention centers in California
Buildings and structures in Downtown Los Angeles
Multi-purpose stadiums in the United States
South Park (Downtown Los Angeles)
Charles Luckman buildings
Grammy Award venues
Venues of the 2028 Summer Olympics
Olympic basketball venues
Olympic boxing venues
Olympic table tennis venues
Olympic cycling venues
Olympic fencing venues
Olympic taekwondo venues